The 2016–17 NJIT Highlanders women's basketball team represented New Jersey Institute of Technology during the 2016–17 NCAA Division I women's basketball season. The Highlanders, led by fifth year head coach Steve Lanpher, played their home games at the Fleisher Center as second year members of the Atlantic Sun Conference. This will be their final season playing at the Fleisher Center before moving to the Wellness and Events Center in 2017. They finished the season 11–19, 4–10 in A-Sun play to finish in fifth place. They lost in the quarterfinals of the A-Sun Tournament to Kennesaw State.

This was their last season playing at Fleisher Center as they moved in to the newly built Wellness and Events Center beginning in the 2017–18 season.

Roster

Schedule

|-
!colspan=9 style="background:#FF0000; color:#FFFFFF;"| Non-conference regular season

|-
!colspan=9 style="background:#FF0000; color:#FFFFFF;"| Atlantic Sun regular season

|-
!colspan=9 style="background:#FF0000; color:#FFFFFF;"| Atlantic Sun Women's Tournament

See also
2015–16 NJIT Highlanders men's basketball team

References

NJIT Highlanders
NJIT Highlanders women's basketball seasons
NJIT Highlanders Women's B
NJIT Highlanders Women's B